Neuburgia collina is a species of plant in the Loganiaceae family. It is endemic to Fiji.

References

Endemic flora of Fiji
collina
Least concern plants
Taxonomy articles created by Polbot